The fifth Cowper ministry was the twelfth ministry of the Colony of New South Wales, and the fifth and final occasion of being led by Sir Charles Cowper.

Cowper was elected in the first free elections for the New South Wales Legislative Assembly held in March 1856, and fought unsuccessfully with Stuart Donaldson to form Government. When Donaldson's Government faltered a little over two months after it was formed, Cowper formed Government on the first occasion, but he also lost the confidence of the Assembly a few months later. Cowper formed Government on the second occasion between 1857 and 1859; but it also lost the confidence of the Assembly. On the third occasion, Cowper formed Government following the decision by the Leader of the Government, John Robertson, to step aside and focus on land reform, however Cowper then lost confidence to James Martin. Cowper retained government on the fourth occasion by defeating Martin at the 1864–65 general election. Following the resignation of his colleague, Robertson, who lost the confidence of the Assembly, Cowper became Premier on the fifth and final occasion in 1870.

The title of Premier was widely used to refer to the Leader of Government, but not enshrined in formal use until 1920.

There was no party system in New South Wales politics until 1887. Under the constitution, ministers were required to resign to recontest their seats in a by-election when appointed. Because the majority  of the ministers retained their appointments from the Robertson ministry, the only by-election that was initially required was for Liverpool Plains with Charles Cowper comfortably re-elected. When John Robertson was subsequently appointed Secretary for Lands, he was re-elected unopposed.

This ministry covers the period from 13 January 1870 until 15 December 1870, when Martin was asked to form government after Cowper again lost the confidence of the Assembly.

Composition of ministry

 
Ministers are members of the Legislative Assembly unless otherwise noted.

See also

Self-government in New South Wales
Members of the New South Wales Legislative Assembly, 1869–1872
First Cowper ministry (1856)
Second Cowper ministry (1857–1859)
Third Cowper ministry (1861–1863)
Fourth Cowper ministry (1865–1866)

References

 

New South Wales ministries
1870 establishments in Australia
1870 disestablishments in Australia